Howard Jacob Goorney (11 May 1921 – 29 March 2007) was a British actor who starred in such programmes as Only Fools and Horses.

He was one of the founder members of Joan Littlewood's 'Theatre Workshop', and wrote The Theatre Workshop Story, published by Methuen - a definitive account of the company's early years, including their move to the Theatre Royal in Stratford East.

He is also known for numerous theatre roles, including Bill Bryden's The Mysteries and Lark Rise to Candleford at the National Theatre in the 1970s and 1980s.

Filmography

References

External links
 

 Obituary in The Guardian
 Obituary in The Independent
 Obituary in The Telegraph
 Obituary in The Times

1921 births
2007 deaths
English male stage actors
English male film actors
English male television actors
Male actors from Manchester